Nephrotoma flavipalpis is a species of crane flies in the family Tipulidae.

Distribution and habitat
This species can be found in most of Europe (Albania, Austria, Belgium, Bosnia-Herzegovina, Croatia, Denmark, France (incl Corsica), Germany, Great Britain, Greece, Ireland, Italy, Lithuania, Luxembourg, Montenegro, Netherlands, Portugal, Romania, Spain, Sweden, Switzerland) and in North Africa (Algeria, Tunisia).  These crane flies usually inhabit woods and hedge rows.

Description
 These crane flies show a lustrous body and a mainly yellow head, with a short proboscis (rostrum) and verticillate antennae. Thorax is yellow and black. On the abdomen there are black and yellow bands. On the wings is present a dark stigma.  

This species is very similar to Nephrotoma scalaris.

Biology
Adults can be seen from June to October. The larvae live in soil.

References

External links
 Nephrotoma flavipalpis at YouTube
Images representing Nephrotoma at BOLD

Tipulidae
Insects described in 1830
Nematoceran flies of Europe